Greydon may refer to:

 Greydon Square
Greydon (surname)